Donaspastus delicatella is a moth of the family Autostichidae. It is found on Corsica.

The wingspan is about 12 mm. The forewings are bluish white, dusted with brownish fuscous. The hindwings are shining sericeous greyish.

References

Moths described in 1901
Donaspastus
Moths of Europe